Hermetia sexmaculata is a species of soldier fly in the family Stratiomyidae.

Distribution
United States, Brazil, Cuba, Dominican Republic, Puerto Rico.

References

Stratiomyidae
Insects described in 1834
Taxa named by Pierre-Justin-Marie Macquart
Diptera of North America
Diptera of South America